Stephen Donald Hopper AC FLS FTSE (born 18 June 1951) is a Western Australian botanist. He graduated in Biology, specialising in conservation biology and vascular plants. Hopper has written eight books, and has over 200 publications to his name. He was Director of Kings Park in Perth for seven years, and CEO of the Botanic Gardens and Parks Authority for five. He is currently Foundation Professor of Plant Conservation Biology at The University of Western Australia. He was Director of the Royal Botanic Gardens, Kew from 2006 to 2012.

This botanist is denoted by the author abbreviation Hopper when citing a botanical name.

Honours
On 1 January 2001, the Australian government awarded Hopper the Centenary Medal for his "service to the community". On 11 June 2012, Hopper was named a Companion of the Order of Australia for "eminent service as a global science leader in the field of plant conservation biology, particularly in the delivery of world class research programs contributing to the conservation of endangered species and ecosystems."

Albany
In 2015 he moved to Albany, Western Australia, and he has returned to his interest in Anigozanthus.

Selected works

 Gondwanan heritage (1996)

with Jane Sampson:

 Endangered poison plants (1989)

with Anne Taylor:

 The Banksia Atlas (1991)

with Bert and Babs Wells:

 Kangaroo paws and catspaws (1993)

with illustrator Philippa Nikulinsky:

Soul of the Desert (2005)
Life on the Rocks (2008)

References

1951 births
Living people
20th-century Australian botanists
21st-century Australian scientists
21st-century Australian botanists
Australian taxonomists
Botanists active in Australia
Botanists active in Kew Gardens
Botanists with author abbreviations
Botany in Western Australia
Companions of the Order of Australia
Fellows of the Australian Academy of Technological Sciences and Engineering
Fellows of the Linnean Society of London
Recipients of the Centenary Medal
Scientists from Western Australia